Patrick Joseph O'Connor may refer to:
 Patrick O'Connor (Australian politician) (1862–1923)
 Padraic Fiacc (1924–2019), Irish poet
 Pat O'Connor (American football) (born 1993), American football player
 Patrick O'Connor (bishop) (1848–1932), Irish-born Roman Catholic bishop in Australia

See also
 Patrick O'Connor (disambiguation)